Paylocity is an American company which provides cloud-based payroll and human capital management software. It has been based in Illinois since its founding in 1997.

History 
The company was founded as Ameripay Payroll Ltd. by Steve Sarowitz in 1997. It was renamed Paylocity in December 2005. It relocated from Franklin Park, Illinois to Elk Grove Village, and later to Arlington Heights. The company has leased 309,000 square feet of office space in the former headquarters of Zurich Insurance North America in Schaumburg, Illinois. The move was completed in 2019.

It was one of the 5,000 fastest growing private companies according to Inc. Magazine in 2003, 2004, and from 2007 to 2014. The company was also included in the Deloitte Fast 500 as one of the fastest growing technology companies in 2013, 2014, and 2015.

Paylocity held an initial public offering (IPO) in March 2014, raising about $120 million.

The company was listed in Glassdoor's Best Places to Work in 2019.

In 2021, Paylocity was listed at #51 in Fortune's 100 Fastest Growing Companies for 2021

References

External links 

Business services companies of the United States
Companies based in Cook County, Illinois
Business services companies established in 1997
Financial services companies established in 1997
Companies listed on the Nasdaq
2014 initial public offerings
Schaumburg, Illinois